Beyond Paradise is a BBC crime drama television series that first aired on 24 February 2023. It is a spin-off of Death in Paradise and stars Kris Marshall.

Main cast
 Kris Marshall as DI Humphrey Goodman
 Sally Bretton as Martha Lloyd, Humphrey’s fiancée 
 Zahra Ahmadi as DS Esther Williams
 Dylan Llewellyn as PC Kelby Hartford
 Felicity Montagu as Margo Martins, office support
 Barbara Flynn as Anne Lloyd, Martha’s mother
 Jamie Bamber as Archie Hughes, Martha's business partner and ex-fiance

Synopsis
The show follows Detective Inspector Humphrey Goodman, who left Saint Marie to be with Martha Lloyd. After becoming engaged, the couple move to Martha's hometown of Shipton Abbott, near the Devon coast. Not long after arriving, Humphrey joins the local police force, where he quickly makes an impression on the local officers: Detective Sergeant Esther Williams, PC Kelby Hartford and office support worker Margo Martins, bringing a whole new approach to police work.

Production

Casting
Kris Marshall was one of the most popular detectives to feature on Death in Paradise and the producers knew he resonated with audiences around the world. The producers felt audiences wanted to know what happened to Humphrey and Martha. Sally Bretton also reprised her role from Death in Paradise.

Zahra Ahmadi and Barbara Flynn had both previously appeared in episodes of Death in Paradise playing different characters.

Location
The series is set in the fictional town of Shipton Abbott, South Devon. A number of locations were considered, but the producers settled on the West Country as they felt that Devon hadn’t been used very often in TV drama. They decided to film in the Cornish town of Looe because it had a thriving community with fishing businesses. The fictional town is set slightly back from the coast so different storylines could be developed.

Episodes

Series overview

Series 1 (2023)

References

External links
 
 

2023 British television series debuts
2020s British crime drama television series
2020s British mystery television series
BBC television dramas
BBC crime television shows
English-language television shows
Television shows set in Devon